John the Good (or Buono) was Archbishop of Milan from c. 641 to 669. He is honoured as a Saint in the Catholic Church and his feast day is on January 2.

Life
The reign of John the Good is remembered for the return of the bishop to the town of Milan after an exile of more than 70 years. Actually in 569, the Lombards invaded Northern Italy and conquered its center, Milan, which was recovering from the terrible Gothic War. The bishop of Milan, Honoratus escaped to Genoa and Honoratus' successors remained in Genoa. Genoa was then a suffragan diocese of Milan but still under the control of the Byzantine Empire.

John the Good was born in the diocese of Genoa in the village of Recco (also the nearby town of Camogli claims the birth of John). It is not exactly known when he became bishop of Milan, but it is believed that his election was in consequence of the 641 conquest of Genoa by the Lombard's King Rothari. John as bishop returned to reside in Milan.

In 649, John was invited to participate to the Lateran Council, but he arrived in Rome when the council had already ended. He however subscribed all the documents issued by the council.

Two are the main sources for John's life: the Catalogue of the Bishops of Milan (dated on about the 10th century) and a poetry in his honor (in ) which can be dated from the 11th to the 13th century. According to this carme, John was distinguished for his generosity and charity, from which he was given the sobriquet the Good. Also according to the carme, he accomplished miracles, he moved some of the relics of Saint Syrus of Genoa to Desio which he erected as ecclesiastical/administrative territory (Pievan Church) and he died in 669 leaving all his properties, including estates in the area of Genoa, to the Church of Milan. The 669 as date of his death is however not coherent with the catalogue, which suggests a ten years reign, i.e. a death no later than the 659.

John died on 2 January according to the catalogue, or on 10 January according to the carme. The latter date became his feast day. Today, his feast is celebrated on 2 January (or 15 January in the cathedral of Milan, together with  all the saint bishops of Milan on 25 September).

The body of John was initially buried in the little church of Saint Michael in Domo in Milan and the first survey on his relics was made by archbishop Aribert (1018–1045). On 24 May 1582, shortly before the demolition of the Church of St Michael, cardinal Carlo Borromeo translated the body of John to the south transept of the cathedral of Milan, where it is still venerated.

Notes

Archbishops of Milan
669 deaths
7th-century Christian saints
Italian saints
Burials at Milan Cathedral
Year of birth unknown